The Women's Individual Time Trial at the 1999 UCI Road World Championships was held on Tuesday October 5, 1999, in Verona, Italy, over a total distance of 25.8 kilometres. There were a total number of 40 starters, with one non-starter. The first woman started at 03:00 pm.

Final classification

References
Results
radsportnews

Women's Time Trial
UCI Road World Championships – Women's time trial
UCI